The Eastern Tennessee Seismic Zone (ETSZ), also known as the East Tennessee Seismic Zone and the Southern Appalachian Seismic Zone, is a geographic band stretching from northeastern Alabama to southwestern Virginia that is subject to frequent small earthquakes.  The ETSZ is one of the most active earthquake zones in the eastern United States.

Earthquake magnitude
Most earthquakes in the ETSZ are small and are detected only with instruments. A few damaging earthquakes have occurred in the ETSZ; the largest historic earthquakes measured 4.6 magnitude, occurring in 1973 near Knoxville, Tennessee and April 29, 2003 near Fort Payne, Alabama. Earthquakes large enough to be felt occur approximately once a year in the ETSZ. The U.S. Geological Survey estimates that earthquakes as large as magnitude 7.5 are possible in the ETSZ. Events of magnitude 5–6 are estimated to occur once every 200 to 300 years.

Seismic source
The source of seismic activity in the ETSZ is not known. The ETSZ is located far from edge of the North American continent and represents a mid-continent or intraplate earthquake zone. The known faults in the ETSZ are generally ancient; no known active faults reach the surface. Research published in 2010 indicates a correlation between the Eastern Tennessee Seismic Zone and the New York-Alabama Lineament and suggests that earthquakes in the seismic zone originate at depth in metasedimentary gneiss.

Seismic events
Earthquakes associated with the ETSZ have included:
 Irondale, Alabama, earthquake, October 18, 1916 (magnitude 5.1)
 1973 Knoxville, Tennessee, earthquake (magnitude 4.6)
 April 29, 2003 earthquake near Fort Payne, Alabama (magnitude 4.6)
December 12, 2018 earthquake north of Decatur, TN and east of Watts Bar Dam (magnitude 4.4 with smaller aftershocks)
 August 9, 2020 earthquake south of Sparta, NC (magnitude 5.1 with small aftershocks)
 October 31, 2020 earthquake 4 miles north-west of Greeneville, TN (magnitude 2.1)
 February 12, 2021 two earthquakes in the Tri-Cities region. One occurred roughly 5.6 miles north-north east of Richlands, Virginia. (magnitude 2.9) The second occurred a few miles south of Erwin, Tennessee. (magnitude 2.5)

See also
 Geology of Alabama
 Geology of Georgia
 Geology of Tennessee
 Geology of the Appalachians
 Virginia Seismic Zone

References

External links
Center for Earthquake Research and Information, University Of Memphis

Earthquakes in Tennessee
Geology of Alabama
Geology of Georgia (U.S. state)
Geology of Tennessee
Geology of Virginia
Seismic zones of the United States